Bratcher is a surname. Notable people with the surname include:

Clifton Rhodes Bratcher (1913–1977), American judge
Joe Bratcher (1898–1977), American baseball player
Kevin Bratcher (born 1961), American politician
Steve Bratcher, American politician

See also
Bratchers Crossroads, Tennessee